Joan Lin Feng-jiao (born 30 June 1953) is a Taiwanese former actress. She is married to Hong Kong-born Chinese actor and martial artist Jackie Chan.

Early life
Born 30 June 1953 in Taipei, Lin was the second child out of five children. She dropped out of school at the age of 12 due to her family's poverty.

Career
In 1972, at age 19, Lin starred in her first film,  (also known as Hero of Waterfront), a Kung fu film. Many of her films are based on the novels of Chiung Yao.

Lin, together with Charlie Chin and Chin Han and Brigitte Lin, were the biggest names in the Taiwanese and Hong Kong cinema industries in the 1970s. Dubbed the "Two Chins, Two Lins" (二秦二林) by the media, they were known for starring in several box-office hits, many of which were adaptations of Chiung Yao's novels.

In 1979, she won Best Leading Actress at the 16th Golden Horse Awards for her performance in The Story of a Small Town. During her 10-year career, Lin appeared in more than 70 films.

Personal life
Joan Lin met Hong Kong-born Chinese actor and martial artist Jackie Chan in January 1981 and they secretly married in Los Angeles in 1982. Their only child, Jaycee Chan, was born the day after they got married. Lin has since retired from the film industry.

Awards and nominations

References

External links

1953 births
Living people
20th-century Taiwanese actresses
Taiwanese film actresses
Taiwanese people of Hoklo descent
Actresses from Taipei